Josan–To Win was a Belgian UCI Continental cycling team founded in 2013 and disbanded in 2014.

References

Cycling teams based in Belgium
Cycling teams established in 2013
Cycling teams disestablished in 2014
UCI Continental Teams (Europe)
Defunct cycling teams based in Belgium
2013 establishments in Belgium
2014 disestablishments in Belgium